Thomas John "T. J." Tucker (born September 20, 1978) is a former Major League Baseball relief pitcher. Choosing to forgo his scholarship offer to kick for the University of Florida Tucker was drafted 47th overall in the MLB draft by the Montreal Expos.

In , Tucker pitched for the Bridgeport Bluefish until his release on August 22. He had a 7.39 ERA in 34 games.

Personal life
Tucker attended River Ridge High School in New Port Richey, Florida. Tucker was an owner and Director of Operations with Z&T Lawn and Landscape in Palm Harbor, Florida.

External links

1978 births
Living people
American expatriate baseball players in Canada
Baseball players from Florida
Bridgeport Bluefish players
Edmonton Trappers players
Harrisburg Senators players
Jupiter Hammerheads players
Major League Baseball pitchers
Montreal Expos players
New Orleans Zephyrs players
Ottawa Lynx players
Vermont Expos players
Washington Nationals players